Konnur is a city in Gokak taluk, Belgaum district in Karnataka, India. The Konnur railway station (Gokak road) is located in Konnur 11 km from Gokak. It is near famous water falls like Gokak falls and Godachinamalki.

References

Villages in Belagavi district